Dana Paul Goldman is the dean of the USC Price School of Public Policy, Leonard D. Schaeffer Chair and director of the University of Southern California Leonard D. Schaeffer Center for Health Policy and Economics, and Professor of Public Policy, Pharmacy, and Economics at the Price School and USC School of Pharmacy. He is also an adjunct professor of health services and radiology at UCLA, and a managing director and founding partner, along with Darius Lakdawalla and Tomas J. Philipson, at Precision Heath Economics, a health care consulting firm. Previously held positions include the director of the Bing Center for Health Economics, RAND Royal Center for Health Policy Simulation, and UCLA/RAND Health Services Research Postdoctoral Training Program.

Goldman's professional interests include the innovation of health technology, the future of America's elderly population, the design of insurance, and disparities in health outcomes. More recently, his work has focused on medical innovation and regulation, comparative effectiveness and outcomes research, and patient-reported outcomes in emerging markets

Goldman is also the founding co-editor of the Forum for Health Economics and Policy and has been on the editorial board of Health Affairs, B.E. Journals of Economic Analysis and Policy, and the RAND Journal of Economics, among others. He is a health policy advisor to the Congressional Budget Office and, in 2009, was elected a member of the Institute of Medicine. He is also the 2009 recipient of the Eugene Garfield Economic Impact Prize, in recognition of his outstanding research on how medical research impacts the economy.

He received his B.A. summa cum laude from Cornell University and a Ph.D. in Economics from Stanford University.

Goldman’s 1997 article, "Redistributional Consequences of Community Rating" discusses a study done in California where health insurance premiums were based on community ratings. The Patient Protection and Accountable Care Act (PPACA) has been passed through Congress and implementation has commenced in the U.S. healthcare system.  Community rating systems will be the basis for health care premiums in the future exchange system.  These ratings, pool people in to demographic groups and charge all members a constant rate. The goal of this system is to prevent medical underwriting and decrease the inequities that occur for clients with higher risks of increased medical utilization present in a risk adjusted system. Goldman et al. conducted a study in California that trialed such clusters of insured clients by pooling at the state level, regional level, and metropolitan level.  Results from California’s experiment with such a system conclude that the larger the areas pooled, the greater the transfer of costs.

Another challenge to community based rating systems is that lower income neighborhoods with lower healthcare utilization subsidize the healthcare cost of higher income communities that tend to have higher healthcare expenditures.

The health exchange system will not be the only place where community rating systems are utilized.  Centers for Medicare and Medicaid Services (CMS) (CMS) plans to initiate a modified rating system starting in January 2014, this may lead other insurance companies following suit.

Due to the results of the California experiment and the widespread use of community based rating systems being initiated, it is imperative that some kind of subsidies be used for low income families. Otherwise, these families may be more likely to avoid insurance due to higher premium costs. This result would be counter intuitive to the goals of implementing the Patient Protection and Affordable Care Act in the U.S. healthcare system.

In 2022, Goldman was elected as a fellow of the National Academy of Public Administration.

Use of drugs for chronic illness when co-payments are doubled
Data from the Centers for Disease Control and Prevention (CDC) revealed that chronic illness affected 133 million people in the United States and accounted for seven out of ten deaths. In relationship to these numbers, the American Society of Health System Pharmacists  say Americans spent $307.5 billion on pharmaceuticals in 2010.

Research by Goldman, Joyce, Escarce, Pace, Soloman, Laouri, Landsman, and Teutsch (2001) studied the purchasing behavior of drugs used to treat eight chronic illnesses: diabetes, high blood pressure, high cholesterol, asthma, depression, allergies, arthritis, and stomach ulcers. This retrospective study presents a strong correlation between co-payment levels and medication use for these chronic illnesses. The study illustrated the change in consumption behaviors based on plan generosity and structure such as coinsurance rates and mandatory generic substitution.

The study by Goldman et al. (2001) predicts there would be a significant decrease in medication utilization in all of the chronic disease categories examined when co-payments were doubled. However, of note, the researchers discovered that patients respond discriminatorily to changes in co-payment and are less likely to reduce consumption of disease specific medications and will reduce pharmacy spending in other medications.
Goldman, et al. (2001) exposed the largest decrease in drug spending when co-payments were doubled were in medications to treat arthritis and allergies.

The study revealed that patients with diabetes decreased their purchase of diabetes drugs the most compared to the other chronic illnesses examined when their co-payments doubled.

The research by Goldman et al. (2001) reveals two points that could inform public policy related to pharmaceutical expenditures. One, consumption of over-the-counter drugs to treat allergies and arthritis are highly influenced by out of pocket spending. Two, diabetes patients may choose lifestyle behavior changes when faced with higher drug costs.

Before changing payment structures, more research will be needed to examine adverse health consequences in the chronically ill if pharmaceutical interventions are limited by increasing out of pocket expenses. For instance, emergency department utilization could rise in response to these changes.

The results of the study by Goldman et al. (2001) could inform public policy on ways to decrease excess drug usage when the benefits are less than the cost of the drug.

References

 http://works.bepress.com/dana_goldman/

External links
 UCLA Profile Page
 http://www.bcbsm.com/content/microsites/health-care-reform/en/reform-alerts/cms-issues-proposed-rule-modified-community-rating.html

Living people
People from Santa Monica, California
Health economists
UCLA School of Public Health faculty
Cornell University alumni
Stanford University alumni
University of Southern California faculty
1966 births